Gilbert Greenall may refer to:

Sir Gilbert Greenall, 1st Baronet (1806–1894), Conservative Member of Parliament and businessman
Gilbert Greenall, 1st Baron Daresbury (1867–1938), businessman, son of the above
Gilbert Greenall (humanitarian advisor), adviser to both the UK government and United Nations on humanitarian emergencies